Diana Iovanovici Șoșoacă (born 13 November 1975 in Bucharest, Romania) is a Romanian lawyer and far-right politician. She gained notorious popularity in 2020 after she published several messages against COVID-19 restriction measures on social media sites such as Facebook. Iovanovici Șoșoacă is a former member of the Alliance for the Union of Romanians (AUR) and part of the Senate of Romania for the Iași County since 21 December 2020. She later said that she did not want to enter the Parliament of Romania but that she was forced by other people who pressured her. On 10 February 2021, she was excluded from AUR's parliamentary group after AUR members Claudiu Târziu and Sorin Lavric proposed her exclusion for not following the party's strategy. Subsequently, on 30 May 2022, she joined S.O.S. Romania, a party founded in November 2021. Șoșoacă is one of the main anti-vaccine figures of the COVID-19 pandemic in Romania. She also supports a Romanian withdrawal from the EU and holds an anti-immigration rhetoric centered on the Syrian-born Romanian physician Raed Arafat.

On 12 December 2021, Șoșoacă was accused by the Italian television channel Rai 1 of having kidnapped the journalist Lucia Goracci following an interview about COVID-19 pandemic. The journalist decided to leave the apartment where the interview was planned to be held after the senator told her that if the person who translate does not translate correctly she will pause them and correct them. Furthermore, one of the teammates tried to enter and a room without consent where the senator had important documents. Therefore the senator did not want them to leave before the police come and question their suspicious acts but the door was never locked as Gorraci left the apartment before police came in. The journalist was later arrested under accusations of possible theft and trespassing made by the senator towards her, and she was released only following the intervention of the Italian embassy in Romania.

Șoșoacă has also been recurrently criticized in Romanian media for her ties with Russia. The Russian state-controlled Sputnik news agency labeled her "the politician of the year 2021 in Romania". Furthermore, in March 2022, in the midst of the Russian invasion of Ukraine, Șoșoacă together with 3 other parliamentarians met with the Russian ambassador in Bucharest "on the theme of the memorandum related to the Peace of Bucharest", discussing a "position of neutrality of Romania" in the invasion, without the approval for representation by the Parliament leadership. One of those parliamentarians was PSD deputy Dumitru Coarnă, who was expelled from the party shortly after the meeting. Additionally, Șoșoacă was appreciated by Killnet, (a pro-Russia hacking group which launched in 2022 a series of cyberattacks on multiple Romanian websites) after she said that Romania must not get involved in Ukraine war.

Notes

References

1975 births
Living people
Lawyers from Bucharest
21st-century Romanian women politicians
21st-century Romanian politicians
Politicians from Bucharest
Alliance for the Union of Romanians politicians
Members of the Senate of Romania
Members of the Romanian Orthodox Church
Romanian anti-vaccination activists
COVID-19 conspiracy theorists
Far-right politics in Romania
Romanian conspiracy theorists
Euroscepticism in Romania